Thom P. Hannum is a percussionist and music educator who is known for being the former associate director of the University of Massachusetts Minuteman Marching Band. He previously served as interim director after the sudden death of bandleader George N. Parks while the Minuteman Band was on a trip to Michigan, and served in this position until 2011, when Timothy Todd Anderson was named the new director.

Thom Hannum has long been regarded as one of the nation’s foremost marching percussion arrangers, instructors, and clinicians having presented numerous seminars and workshops.

Early life 
Hannum grew up in the Philadelphia area of Pennsylvania. When Hannum was 10, he began to play the drums with the Brookhaven Crusaders, a local drum corps located in the suburbs of Philadelphia. He continued to play throughout high school and joined the marching band at West Chester University where he studied history and secondary education. In 1980, George N. Parks asked him to become a graduate assistant at University of Massachusetts Amherst. Hannum decided that he “had nothing to lose and everything to gain” and accepted the position. He received his master’s degree from UMass in 1984 and was offered a newly created assistant director position with the band.

Career 
Thom Hannum taught at the University of Massachusetts for over 40 years, where he served as the Associate Director of the Minuteman Marching Band. In early 2020, Hannum announced he would be switching to a part time role within the UMass Marching band. Hannum stated "after a great deal of thought and careful consideration the time has come for me to scale back my activities and the time spent with the Minuteman Marching Band and other associated duties". In late May 2021, alumnus Ian Hale was announced the new Associate Director and head of percussion of the Minuteman Marching Band, replacing Thom Hannum after 40 years.

Hannum has been heavily involved in Drum Corps International where he is currently a percussion consultant for the Carolina Crown Drum and Bugle Corps. He is also known for his work with The Cadets Drum and Bugle Corps, Star of Indiana Drum and Bugle Corps, and Crossmen Drum and Bugle Corps. In the summer of 2001, Hannum was inducted into the Drum Corps International Hall of Fame, and in 2008 he was inducted into the World Drum Corps Hall of Fame. In 2019, he was awarded the Distinguished Service to Music Medal, the highest available honor from music fraternity Kappa Kappa Psi.

In addition to his involvement in the marching arts, Hannum was on the design team for the Tony and Emmy winning musical, Blast!

References

External links
 Official website
 Interview with Michael R. Homes from the University of Massachusetts Amherst Oral History Collection
 Biography from the Drum Corps International Hall of Fame

American percussionists
American male drummers
University of Massachusetts Amherst faculty
University of Massachusetts Minuteman Marching Band
West Chester University alumni
University of Massachusetts Amherst alumni
Living people
People from Amherst, Massachusetts
1957 births
University and college band directors
People from West Chester, Pennsylvania